This is a timeline for the Battle of the Atlantic (1939–1945) in World War II.

1939

August 
August 19, 1939
 Five U-boats sail from Kiel and nine from Wilhelmshaven to take waiting positions in the North Atlantic.
August 21, 1939
 German "pocket battleship"  sails from Wilhelmshaven for a South Atlantic cruise.
August 24, 1939
 German "pocket battleship"  sails from Wilhelmshaven for a North Atlantic cruise.

September 
September 3, 1939
This attack is interpreted by the United Kingdom as the start of unrestricted submarine warfare. However, in Germany it leads to stricter controls being issued by the Kriegsmarine. Germany at this point had 39 of its 58 U-boats at sea, but this was far less than the 300 which Admiral Karl Dönitz, chief of German submarine forces, considered to be necessary before the opening of war.
September 5, 1939
  stops, evacuates and sinks the German freighter Inn off the Canary Islands.
September 7, 1939
 The first convoys sail outbound from the British Isles: OA from the English Channel, OB from Liverpool, and OG to Gibraltar.
September 14, 1939
 The first of the SL convoys sails from Freetown.
  attacks the British aircraft carrier , but fails to cause any damage. The aircraft carrier's escorts force U-39 to the surface with depth charges and the crew are taken prisoner.
September 16, 1939
 The first Allied convoy sets sail from Halifax, Nova Scotia.
September 17, 1939
  sinks the Royal Navy aircraft carrier .
September 17, 1939
 The first Allied "fast convoy" HXF 1 sets sail from Halifax escorted by HMCS Fraser formerly .
September 20, 1939
September 26, 1939
 German media reports the sinking of the British aircraft carrier .  However, this report is false: many such reports would be made during the war.
September 30, 1939
 German "pocket battleship"  sinks the first merchant ship of its cruise.  Total sinkings for its sortie will total nine vessels of 50,000 tons before it becomes embroiled in the Battle of the River Plate.

October 
October 5, 1939
 German "pocket battleship"  sinks the first merchant ship of its cruise.
October 14, 1939
 , under Kapitänleutnant Günther Prien, penetrates the British naval base at Scapa Flow, sinking  at anchor.
October 16, 1939
 Germany begins employing magnetic mines.  These cause significant losses to Allied shipping.
October 27, 1939
  sinks Malabar from convoy HX 5.
October 30, 1939
  sinks Bronte from convoy OB 25.

November 
November 21, 1939
 British light cruiser  hits a German mine, and is seriously damaged while operating in the Firth of Forth.
November 23, 1939
 A German magnetic mine is recovered successfully by the Allies, leading to the development of effective countermeasures.  The German battleship  sinks the British armed merchant vessel .  The Scharnhorst and the accompanying  are forced to abandon their sortie and return to port.
November 25, 1939
  sinks Royston Grange from convoy SL 8.

December 
December 4, 1939
 First U-boat lost to an Allied submarine in the war when  sinks  outside Kristiansund in Norway.
December 5, 1939
  sinks Navasota from convoy OB 46.
December 10, 1939
 The first Allied troop convoy TC 1 sets sail from Halifax with 7,400 men of the 1st Canadian Infantry Division.

1940

January 
January 30, 1940
  sinks Vaclite and Keramiai from convoy OA 80G.

February 
February 5, 1940
  sinks Beaverburn from convoy OA 84.
February 14, 1940
 The United Kingdom announces armaments will be carried by all passenger ships.  Germany responds by announcing that all vessels will be considered warships.

March 
March 16, 1940
 A German air raid at Scapa Flow damages a cruiser and causes the first civilian casualties in Britain of the war.

June 
June 12, 1940
  sinks Willowbank and Barbara Marie from convoy SL 34.
June 14, 1940
  sinks Italia and Erik Boye from convoy HX 47.
June 22, 1940
  sinks San Fernando from convoy HX 49.
June 25, 1940
  sinks Saranac and Windsorwood from convoy OA 172.
 Canada loses its first navy vessel during an accident off the coast of France, when  is cut in two by Royal Navy cruiser , with 45 lives lost aboard the Fraser and 19 aboard Calcutta.
June 30, 1940
 U-boats sink two ships from convoy SL 36.

July 
July 2, 1940
 Aircraft sink Aeneas from convoy OA 177G.
July 4, 1940
 Aircraft and E-boats sink five ships from convoy OA 178.
July 8, 1940
  sinks Humber Arm from convoy HX 53.
July 10, 1940
  sinks Alwaki from convoy OA 179.
July 17, 1940
 U-boats sink Manipur and Scottish Minstrel from convoy HX 55.
July 26, 1940
  sinks four ships from convoy OB 188.
July 31, 1940
  sinks Jersey City from convoy OB 191.

August 
 BETASOM base opens in Bordeaux for Italian submarine patrols into the Atlantic.
August 4, 1940
  sinks 3 British merchant steamships from convoy HX 60.
August 5, 1940
  sinks Boma from convoy OB 193.
August 15, 1940
 A new system of SC convoys is initiated between Canada and the British Isles, to provide convoy protection for slow ships.
August 16, 1940
  sinks Hedrun from convoy OB 197.
August 23, 1940
  sinks Cumberland and St. Dunstan from convoy OB 202.
 Aircraft sink Llanishen and Makalla from convoy OA 203.
August 24, 1940
  sinks Blairmore from convoy SC 1.
August 25, 1940
 Convoy HX 65 comes under attack by U-boats and aircraft sinking five ships.
August 28, 1940
 U-boats sink four ships from convoy HX 66.
  sinks Dalblair and Astra II from convoy OA 204.
August 30, 1940
  torpedoes San Gabriel from convoy OB 205.
August 31, 1940

September 
September 2, 1940
  sinks Thornlea from convoy OB 206.
September 4, 1940
  sinks Titan from convoy OA 207.
September 6, 1940
 Aircraft sink St. Glen from convoy SL 44.
September 8, 1940
 U-boats sink two ships from convoy SC 2.
September 15, 1940
  sinks Alexandrios and Empire Volunteer from convoy SC 3.
 Aircraft sink Nailsea River from convoy SL 45.
September 17, 1940
  sinks Tregenna from convoy HX 71.
September 18, 1940
  sinks Marina and City of Benares from convoy OB 213.
September 20, 1940
  sinks four ships from convoy OB 216.
September 21, 1940
 U-boats sink six ships from convoy HX 72.
September 26, 1940
  sinks Manchester Brigade and Stratford from convoy OB 218.
September 27, 1940
 Aircraft sink Port Denison from convoy OA 220.
September 28, 1940
 Aircraft sink Dalveen from convoy HX 73.
  sinks Empire Ocelot from convoy OB 218.

October 
October 9, 1940
  sinks three ships from convoy SC 6.
October 11, 1940
 U-boats sink six ships from convoy HX 77.
October 14, 1940
  sinks Hurunui from convoy OA 228.
October 15, 1940
  sinks Bonheur from convoy OB 228.
October 17, 1940
  sinks Dokka and Uskbridge from convoy OB 228.
October 18, 1940
 Minelaying begins on the Allied Northern Barrage minefield between Scotland and Greenland.
October 19, 1940
 U-boats sink ten ships from convoy HX 79 and fifteen ships from convoy SC 7.
October 22, 1940
 , recently acquired to replace , is sunk in a collision with the freighter  480 km west of Ireland.  142 men are lost, including the captain and four other officers.

November 
November 5, 1940
 German "pocket battleship"  sinks five ships from convoy HX 84 and the escorting armed merchant cruiser .
  sinks Scottish Maiden from convoy HX 83.
November 6, 1940
 Aircraft sink Nalon from convoy SL 52F.
November 15, 1940
 Aircraft sink Apapa from convoy SL 53.
November 21, 1940
  sinks Daydawn and Victoria from convoy OB 244.
November 22, 1940
  sinks King Idwal from convoy OB 244.
November 23, 1940
 sinks six ships from convoy SC 11.

December 
December 1, 1940
 U-boats sink nine ships from convoy HX 90.
  is the first Canadian naval vessel hit by torpedo in the Battle of the Atlantic, attacked 300 miles west of Ireland by a submarine while escorting Convoy HG 47.
December 11, 1940
  sinks three ships from convoy HX 92.
December 27, 1940
 Italian submarine Enrico Tazzoli sinks Ardanbhan from convoy OB 263.

1941

January 
January 16, 1941
 Aircraft sink two ships from convoy OB 274.
January 29, 1941
 sinks three ships from convoy SC 19.

February 
February 12, 1941
  sinks seven ships from convoy SL 64S.
February 19, 1941
 Aircraft sink three ships from convoy OB 287.
February 24, 1941
 sinks three ships from convoy OB 289.
February 26, 1941
Aircraft sink eight ships from convoy OB 290.
February 27, 1941
 sinks Kasongo and Borgland from convoy OB 290.

March 
March 1, 1941
  sinks Cadillac from convoy HX 109.
 Aircraft sink Rotula from convoy SC 22.
March 7, 1941
U-boats sink three ships from convoy OB 293.
March 8, 1941
 U-boats sink five ships from convoy SL 67.
March 13, 1941
 Aircraft sink Empire Frost from convoy SC 23.
March 16, 1941
  sinks five ships from convoy HX 112.
March 17, 1941
 U-boats sink six ships from convoy SL 68.
March 19, 1941
 Aircraft sink Benvorlich from convoy OB 298.
March 29, 1941
  sinks three ships from convoy HX 115.

April 
April 1, 1941
 Aircraft sink two ships from convoy HX 114.
April 3, 1941
 U-boats sink six ships from convoy SC 26.
April 6, 1941
 Aircraft sink Dunstan from convoy OB 306.
April 9, 1941
 The United States occupies Greenland.
April 16, 1941
 Aircraft sink Swedru from convoy SL 69.
April 28, 1941
 U-boats sink four ships from convoy HX 121.

May 
May 8, 1941
 U-boats sink five ships from convoy OB 318.
May 11, 1941
 Aircraft sink Somerset from convoy SL 72.
May 14, 1941
 Aircraft sink Karlander from convoy OB 321.
May 20, 1941
 U-boats sink nine ships from convoy HX 126.
  sinks Starcross from convoy SL 73.
May 21 or 22, 1941
May 24, 1941
 Bismarck and Prinz Eugen intercept the path of battleship  and battlecruiser ; Battle of Denmark Strait begins.
 Bismarck sinks HMS Hood then badly damages Prince of Wales, forcing it to retreat.
May 27, 1941.
 Bismarck sunk.

June 
June 1, 1941
 The United States Coast Guard begins the Greenland Patrol.
June 11, 1941
 Aircraft sink Baron Carnegie from convoy OB 334.
June 13, 1941
  sinks Djurdjura and Eirini Kyriakidou from convoy SL 76.
 Newfoundland Escort Force is created under the command of Admiral Murray based at St John's Newfoundland, to provide escort cover from the coast of Canada to Iceland.
June 24, 1941
  sinks Schie and Kinross from convoy OB 336.
 U-boats sink five ships from convoy HX 133.
June 26, 1941
 U-boats sink four ships from convoy SL 78.

July 
July 7, 1941
 President Roosevelt announces that US warships will henceforth protect US merchant vessels in the North Atlantic, and the US effectively joined the Battle of the Atlantic.

August 
August 5, 1941
 U-boats sink five ships from convoy SL 81.

September 
September 10, 1941
 While U-boats sink fifteen ships from convoy SC 42, Canadian corvettes  and  sink  by depth charges and ramming in the Denmark Strait south of Tasiilaq, Greenland.  This is Canada's first U-boat kill of the Battle of the Atlantic.
September 15, 1941
 Aircraft sink Daru from convoy SL 85.
September 19, 1941
  is the first Canadian corvette sunk during the war.  Levis is hit by a torpedo while escorting Convoy SC 44 off the coast of Greenland. Four merchant ships are also sunk from the convoy by U-boats.
September 22, 1941
 U-boats sink seven ships from convoy SL 87.

October 
October 16, 1941
 U-boats sink nine ships from convoy SC 48.
October 21, 1941
  sinks Serbino and Treverbyn from convoy SL 89.
October 31, 1941
  torpedoes , which was escorting Convoy HX 156. Reuben James is the first United States warship sunk during World War II.

November 
November 3, 1941
 U-boats sink nine ships from convoy SC 52.

December 
December 10, 1941
  sinks three ships from convoy SC 57.

1942

January 
January 12, 1942
  is sunk 160 miles south of Halifax, heralding the start of a U-boat campaign that saw approximately 200 merchant vessels sunk within 10 miles of the east coast of the US.
January 30, 1942
 Convoy SC 67 departs from Halifax and picks up a transatlantic escort in Newfoundland, which accompanies the convoy as far as Northern Ireland.  This marks the start of the allied end-to-end convoy escort system, which remained in effect until the end of the war.

February 
February 10, 1942
  sinks Heina from convoy SC 67.
February 15, 1942
 30 miles southwest of Cape Henry  sinks Brazilian steamer Buarque (which became the 1st of 36 Brazilian merchant ships that would be sunk in WWII).
February 16, 1942
 Operation Neuland opens with attacks on Aruba, Curaçao and Lake Maracaibo petroleum facilities.

March 
March 20, 1942
 A new system of BX and XB convoys is initiated between Halifax and Boston, to counter the U-boat campaign along the east coast of the US.

May 
May 12, 1942
  sinks Denpark from convoy SL 109.
 May 18–22, 1942
 Along Natal coast, although damaged the Italian submarine Barbarigo manage to escape two times of attacks done by Brazilians B-25, after have unsuccessfully tried to sink Brazilian merchant ship "Comandante Lyra" at May 18.

June 
June 10, 1942
  torpedoes and sinks the British freighter Nicoya at the mouth of the St. Lawrence River several kilometres off Anticosti Island, followed by the Dutch freighter Leto

July 
July 4, 1942
 Convoy PQ 17 is scattered in the Barents Sea leading to the loss of 22 Allied merchant ships.
July 5, 1942
 Six ships are sunk when convoy QP 13 strays into Allied minefield SN72 in the Denmark Strait.
July 6, 1942
  sinks three freighters off the Gaspé coast

August 
August 8, 1942
 U-boats sink eleven ships from convoy SC 94.
August 15, 1942
  sinks Balladier from convoy SC 95.
August 16, 1942
  sinks Baependy, a Brazilian merchant ship, killing 270 civilians.
 Few hours later, the same U-507 sinks another Brazilian passenger ship, the SS Araraquara, killing another 131 people,
 Followed hours later by the SS Annibal Benevolo, on which 150 civilians drowned.
August 17, 1942
 U-507 continues its slaughter, sinking another Brazilian merchant ship, the SS Itagiba at the city of Vitória, killing 36,
 and the SS Arara similarly sunk with 20 deaths as she picked up the survivors of the Itagiba.
 U-boats sink four ships from convoy SL 118.
August 19, 1942
 U-507 sinks the tiny sailing vessel Jacyra.
August 22, 1942
 U-507 sinks Hammeran, a Swedish merchant ship. In just one week, U-507 acting in Brazilian waters killed over 600 people, all of them neutral civilians. As result, Brazil declares war on Germany and Italy at that very same day.
August 28, 1942
  sinks Zuiderkerk and City of Cardiff from convoy SL 119.
August 31, 1942
  sinks Bronxville and Capira from convoy SC 97.

September 
September 9, 1942 USS Muskeget, a Coast Guard weather ship, is torpedoed near Weather Station #2, Lat. 54o N, Long 44o 30’W by U-755. 121 Officers and crew lost, including one Public Health Service officer and four weathermen, no survivors.

September 14, 1942

  is torpedoed by  while escorting Convoy ON 127 500 nautical miles (930 km) east of St. John's, Newfoundland.  114 crew lost their lives, including the commanding officer, while 65 survivors were rescued by nearby vessels.
September 20, 1942
  sinks Empire Hartebeeste from convoy SC 100.
September 22, 1942
  sinks Athelsultan and Tennessee from convoy SC 100.

October 
October 4, 1942
  sinks Robert H Colley from convoy HX 209.
October 13, 1942
 U-boats sink seven ships from convoy SC 104.
October 14, 1942
October 24, 1942
 A new system of UG convoys is initiated between Chesapeake Bay and the Mediterranean Sea, to support the Allied invasion of North Africa.
October 25, 1942
 Battle of convoy SL 125 begins as a tactical diversion to clear U-boats from the path of Operation Torch invasion convoys.
October 27, 1942
 U-boats sink five ships from convoy HX 212.

November 
November 2, 1942
 U-boats sink fifteen ships from convoy SC 107.
November 18, 1942
  sinks Brilliant from convoy SC 109.

December 
December 8, 1942
 U-boats sink two ships from convoy HX 217.

1943

January 
January 3, 1943
 U-507 sinks the British ship Baron Dachmont.
January 8, 1943
 U-507 sinks the British ship Yorkwood.
January 13, 1943
 U-507 was sunk by the US PBY Catalina VP-83.
January 17, 1943
  sinks Vestfold from convoy HX 222.
January 26, 1943
  sinks Nortind from convoy HX 223.

February 
February 2, 1943
  sinks  from convoy SG 19 killing 675 men.
  sinks Inverilen and Jeremiah Van Rensselaer from convoy HX 224.
February 7, 1943
 U-boats sink nine ships from convoy SC 118.
February 15, 1943
 A new system of fast CU convoys is initiated to speed the flow of petroleum products from Caribbean Sea refineries to Liverpool.

March 
March 7, 1943
 U-boats sink seven ships for convoy SC 121.
March 10, 1943
 U-boats sink four ships from convoy HX 228.
March 16, 1943
 The largest convoy battle of World War II begins around convoys HX 229 and SC 122.
March 28, 1943
 U-boats sink four ships from convoy SL 126.

April 
April 4, 1943
 U-boats sink three ships from convoy HX 231.
April 12, 1943
  sinks three ships from convoy HX 232.
April 17, 1943
 U-boats sink Fort Rampart from convoy HX 233.
April 22, 1943
  sinks Amerika from convoy HX 234.

May 
May 6, 1943
 The battle for convoy ONS 5 reaches a climax with the destruction of seven U-boats.
May 7, 1943
  sinks Laconikos from convoy SL 128MK.
May 11, 1943
  sinks Antigone and Grado from convoy SC 129.

July 
July 31, 1943
 In a coordinated action, one American and two Brazilian maritime patrol aircraft sink the then modern U-199.

September 
September 8, 1943
 Italy surrenders, and Britain starts to redeploy their Mediterranean destroyers to the Atlantic.

October 
October 9, 1943
  sinks Yorkmar from convoy SC 143.
October 31, 1943
  sinks Hallfried from convoy SL 138MK.

December 
December 26, 1943

1944

April 
April 6, 1944
  sinks Ruth I and South America from convoy SC 156.

July 
July 20, 1944
  sinks the freighter-troopship Vital de Oliveira, the only Brazilian military ship sunk due to submarine action at WWII, and the last Brazilian vessel to be torpedoed in that war.

August 
August 3, 1944
 The largest convoy of World War II, convoy HX 300, arrives in the British Isles without loss.

September 
September 8, 1944
  sinks Empire Heritage and Pinto from convoy HX 305.

1945

January 
January 27, 1945
  sinks Solor from convoy HX 332.

March 
March 2, 1945
  sinks Novasli and King Edgar from convoy SC 167.

April 
April 18, 1945
  sinks Empire Gold and Cyrus H McCormick from convoy HX 348.

Month-by-month summaries

1939 
 September
  Allied shipping losses total 53 vessels.  41 vessels totaling 153,800 tons are lost to submarines.  German losses are two submarines.
 October
  Allied shipping losses total 196,000 tons.  German losses are five submarines.
 November
  Allied shipping losses to submarines are 21 vessels totaling 51,600 tons.  More than 100,000 tons are lost to German mines.
 December
  Allied shipping losses are 73 vessels totaling 189,900 tons.  25 are sunk by submarines.  The Germans lose one submarine.

Total Allied losses to mines during 1939 are 79 vessels totaling 262,700 tons.

1940 
 January
  Allied losses are 73 vessels totaling 214,500 tons, of which 40 vessels totaling 111,200 tons are sunk by submarines.  Germany has 38 operational submarines to begin the year.
 February
  Allied losses are 226,900 tons, of which 45 vessels totaling 169,500 tons are lost to submarines.
 March
  Allied losses are 45 vessels, of which 23 are lost to submarines.  Germany loses three submarines.
 October
 Massacre of Convoy SC 7

1941 
 June
  Allied losses are 590,000 tons

1942

1943 
 March
 Allied shipping losses are 627,000 tons.
 April
 Closing of Mid-Atlantic gap
 May
 Allied shipping losses are 157,000 tons, and 37 U-boats are sunk plus 32 damaged.
 U-boats withdrawn Black May
 June
 17 U-boats destroyed
 July
 46 U-boats destroyed
 August
 20 U-boats destroyed

References 
 The Battle of the Atlantic by John Costello and Terry Hughes (1977, Collins, London) 
 Barone, João (2013) 1942: O Brasil e sua guerra quase desconhecida (1942: Brazil and its almost forgotten war) (in Portuguese), Rio de Janeiro, 
 Donald A Bertke, Gordon Smith & Don Kinde.World War II Sea War, Vol 5. Bertke Publications, 2013. 
 
 Carey, Alan C. (2004) Galloping Ghosts of the Brazilian Coast Lincoln, NE, US: iUniverse, Inc. 
 Hague, Arnold The Allied Convoy System 1939–1945 Naval Institute Press 2000 
 
 
 
 Scheina, Robert L. Latin America's Wars Volume II: The Age of the Professional Soldier, 1900–2001. Potomac Books, 2003.

Notes

External links 
 The Battle of the Atlantic Original reports and pictures from The Times
 Chronology 1939-1942 at naval-history.net
 Chronology 1942-1945 at naval-history.net

Chronology of World War II